Afric'Air Charter was an airline based in Benin that operated between 2002 and 2004.

See also		
 List of defunct airlines of Benin

References

External links
Airline recorded as defunct in: Airline History - Benin

Defunct airlines of Benin
Airlines established in 2002
Airlines disestablished in 2004
2002 establishments in Benin